Félix Grande Lara (February 4, 1937, in Mérida - January 30, 2014, in Madrid) was a Spanish poet and flamenco expert. He won the Premio Adonáis de Poesía for his poem Las piedras in 1963. He won a Casa de las Américas Prize for his poem Blanco Spirituals in 1967. He won a Felipe Trigo Award for El marido de Alicia in 1994. He was awarded the Premio Nacional de las Letras Españolas in 2004. He was married to poet Francisca Aguirre, with whom he had a daughter, poet Guadalupe Grande.

References 

1937 births
2014 deaths
Spanish poets